Halaç  is a city and capital of Halaç District, Lebap Province, Turkmenistan.

Etymology
Halaç (Halach) is the name of an ancient Oghuz Turkmen tribe. The meaning is obscure. Early linguists divided the name into two parts, gal aç ("remain hungry") or gal, aç ("stay, open"). Vambery considered it to be a corruption of gylyç ("sword").

References

Populated places in Lebap Region